British Moroccans are citizens and/or residents of the United Kingdom whose ethnic origins lie fully or partially in Morocco.

Migration history
Mass migration from Morocco to the United Kingdom began in the 1960s, primarily consisting of migrant workers recruited to work in the hotel and catering industries. The community has grown significantly due to high birth rates as well as sponsored migration of dependents.

Population and distribution
The 2001 Census recorded 12,348 Moroccan-born people residing in the UK. 2009 estimates reported by the Runymede Trust suggested between 65,000 and 70,000 people of Moroccan origin reside in the UK. The Office for National Statistics estimates the Moroccan-born population to have been 34,000 in 2015. Outside of London, Trowbridge, the county town of Wiltshire, has the highest population of Moroccans in the UK. In 2009 the town became the first in the UK to be twinned with a place from a muslim country – Oujda – due to large number of resident families with roots in the town.

According to the 2011 UK Census, a total of 21,880 people born in Morocco were residing in the UK: 21,016 were recorded in England, 230 in Wales, 530 in Scotland  and 104 in Northern Ireland.

The National Association of British Arabs categorises Morocco-born immigrants as Arabs. Based on census data, it indicates that they are the sixth largest population of British Arabs by country of birth.

Notable British-Moroccans or Moroccans in the United Kingdom 

Adam Gemili: Professional sprinter
Amelle Berrabah: singer and member of girl band Sugababes
Chico Slimani (Youssef Slimani): Singer
Houda Echouafni: actress (of Moroccan and Egyptian origins)
Kamal El-Hajji, (BEM): (Mohammed Amal El-Hajji) Serjeant-at-Arms of the House of Commons (in 2015)
Karim Zeroual: Television presenter
Karima Adebibe: Model
Kieran Djilali: Professional football player

Laila Rouass: Actress
Layla El: Model, dancer, and former WWE wrestler. 
Malika Zouhali-Worrall: Documentary filmmaker
Mariah Idrissi: Muslim Hijab-wearing model, public speaker, and online personality.
Moe Sbihi, (MBE): (Mohamed Karim Sbihi) Rower and twice Olympic medal winner
Nabil Elouahabi: Actor
Souad Talsi, (MBE): Founder of Al-Hasaniya Moroccan Women’s Centre

Associations 

 Al-Hasaniya Moroccan Women's Centre
 Al Manaar Mosque (The Muslim Cultural Heritage Centre - MCHC)
 Moroccan Memories foundation: Memories in Britain (Oral & Visual Achieve) 
 Al-Noor Youth Trust 
 The Council for Arab-British Understanding(Caabu)

References

External links
Moroccan Londoner Forum
Moroccan Star
Moroccan Community in the UK

African diaspora in the United Kingdom
 
Moroccan diaspora in Europe
Muslim communities in Europe
Morocco
Islam in the United Kingdom